High Adventure Bases of the Boy Scouts of America are outdoor recreation facilities located in several locales in North America operated by the Boy Scouts of America at the organization's national level. Each facility offers wilderness programs and training that could include wilderness canoeing, wilderness backpacking trips, or sailing, and provide opportunities for Scouts to earn the 50-Miler Award. These bases are administered by the High Adventure Division of the National Council of the Boy Scouts of America.

Northern Tier National High Adventure Bases

The Northern Tier National High Adventure Bases are a collection of high adventure bases in Minnesota, Ontario, and Manitoba. It is made up of Charles L. Sommers Canoe Base in Ely, Minnesota operating in the Boundary Waters Canoe Area Wilderness (BWCAW) and Quetico Provincial Park, Don Rogert Canoe Base in Atikokan, Ontario operating in Quetico Provincial Park, and Norther Expeditions Base in Bissett, Manitoba operating in Atikaki Provincial Wilderness Park and points beyond. Collectively, it is the oldest national high adventure base operated by the BSA.

Northern Tier offers mostly wilderness canoe trips, although other activities such as cold weather camping exist as well. Typical canoe trips cover  and take 6 to 10 days. With each crew is a highly skilled technician/instructor called an "Interpreter".

Philmont Scout Ranch

The main part of the ranch, formerly the property of oil baron Waite Phillips, was donated to the Scouting organization in 1938. Along with other donations and purchases, it is currently in use as a national high adventure base where crews of Scouts and Venturers take part in backpacking expeditions and other outdoor activities. It is the largest youth camp in the world by size.

Philmont is also home to the Philmont Training Center, which is the main center for BSA's national-level training for volunteers and professionals. In addition to its BSA programs, Philmont continues to operate as a ranch, maintaining a stock of cattle, horses, burros and bison.

Florida National High Adventure Sea Base

Sea Base High Adventure is a high adventure program base in the Florida Keys. The main Sea Base is located in Islamorada, Florida on the end of Lower Matecumbe Key.

Main programs include sailing— including open water and reef sailing —island camping, snorkeling, and SCUBA. The Florida Sea Base Conference Center has become an alternative training site to the Philmont Training Center. Most conferences it hosts are for professionals or national level committees, but it also hosts conferences for outside groups.

Paul R. Christen National High Adventure Base

The Paul R. Christen National High Adventure Base is a high adventure program base located at the Summit Bechtel Family National Scout Reserve. The Summit was purchased in 2009 and the high adventure base began operation in 2014. The New River Gorge region offers white water rafting rated from Class II to Class V along the more than 50 miles of river within the New River Gorge National River area. Other outdoor activities that are popular to the area include Rock climbing, rappelling (abseiling), mountain biking, hiking, geocaching, and orienteering. Some of the additional activities added with help from Scout feedback at the 2010 Jamboree, are skateboarding, freestyle BMX, mountainboarding, ATV riding, paddle boarding, dragon boats racing, and ziplines.

The Summit is also the site for the national Scout jamboree and a training center. The property consists of a  reclaimed mine site near Beckley, West Virginia. The purchase was enabled by a $50 million grant from Stephen Bechtel, Jr. The Summit is being developed by Arrow WV, a BSA subsidiary. Consol Energy donated $15 million to build a  bridge to connect the main activity area to the eastern property.

Former national bases

Northern Wisconsin National Canoe Base

Northern Wisconsin National Canoe Base was opened in 1940 on the site of a former Civilian Conservation Corps camp on the south end of the east shore of White Sand Lake in northern Wisconsin. The closest town to that site is Boulder Junction, Wisconsin.

The base was originally named MIWI after the initials of the four states in the region. In 1943 it was renamed Region 7 Canoe Base. The base had also been referenced in publications as Region Seven Explorer Canoe Base. Around 1967 it was renamed Northern Wisconsin National Canoe Base, as publications begin referencing the new name during this period. By that time, thousands of Scouts were embarking on wilderness canoe trips from the canoe base every summer, principally from the Chicago area due to its proximity.

The primary program was wilderness canoe trips, through the lakes and rivers of northern Wisconsin and the southern edge of the Upper Peninsula of Michigan. The base provided training, outfitting, and guiding for these trips as well as sleeping and meal facilities for groups of 6-12 crew members, including an adult leader, as they prepared to start or end canoe trips. They also provided transportation to and from starting and ending points. Training included an intensive Voyageur course for the youth leader of a group during the week prior to the group's trip. Additional programs for Scouts included whitewater trips on the lower Flambeau Flowage, swimming at the White Sand Lake beach, informal sandlot football and softball games between staff members and Scouts at the base, and winter camping in the cabins left by the CCC.

Canoe trips launched from the base utilized hundreds of different lakes and rivers and about 300 campsites. About half of these sites were on public lands; the others were on private lands under special arrangements, which typically included maintenance work by the Scouts. Examples of closer frequently used waterways include White Sand, Lost Canoe, Pallette, Escanaba, Presque Isle, Crab, Trout, Boulder, and Wild Rice lakes and the Manitowish and Trout Rivers. In the 1960s, staff tried to open up new routes using creeks, with occasionally hilarious results.

The base celebrated its 40th anniversary in 1980 and enjoyed its most popular years in 1980-81, but usage declined rapidly and the permanent base was closed in 1983. Numerous interrelated factors contributed to its demise, including Scout leaders and executives lobbying for closure in favor of other bases, declining usage, increased residential development in the area used for its canoe trips, and a heavy snowfall during the 1982-83 winter that collapsed the roof of the dining hall, which was never rebuilt.

While the permanent base was closed, expeditions continued to be led using guides from Charles Sommers base until the summer of 1986.  The penultimate canoe trip was with Troop 912 from Manitowoc, Wisconsin from 8/10/1986 to 8/16/1986.

Maine National High Adventure Area
The Maine National High Adventure Area was established in 1970 due to the efforts of BSA Scout Executive Bud Jeffrey, Seven Island Lands Company President John Sinclair, and Bill Wadsworth and John Donnell of the BSA National Office. The first of three Maine National High Adventure bases was established at the site of the former Foster’s Matagamon Sporting Camp on the north side of Matagamon Lake, and was called Maine Matagamon National High Adventure Base. This base operated as a single unit in 1971 and 1972. An additional base was established at Pittston Farm on Seboomook Lake in 1973, and a third on Sysladobsis Lake, was operated in 1971 and 1979.

Matagamon and Seboomook bases were the core of the program for many years. It was a highly successful program that exposed thousands of Scouts to the lakes, rivers, and mountains of the North Maine woods, providing them with a lifetime appreciation of wild lands, no trace camping, and self-sufficiency and safety in the wilderness.

Maine National High Adventure was operated as a national base until 1991, when the National BSA Office shut down the program. In 1993, the Matagamon base reopened as Maine High Adventure, an outdoor program run today by the Katahdin Area Council.

There is an active staff association called Maine High Adventure Staff Association that is dedicated to the history of the Maine National High Adventure Area, and to the support of the current Maine High Adventure Area.

Land Between the Lakes National Outdoor Adventure Center
The Land Between the Lakes National Outdoor Adventure Center was a regional high adventure base in Kentucky on the shores of Kentucky Lake near Aurora. It opened in 1973 as a cooperative effort between the BSA and the Tennessee Valley Authority. The base offered sailing trips on the  Kentucky Lake. Land Between the Lakes ceased operation as national base in 1983. Since then, Camp Roy C. Manchester also located on Kentucky Lake operates the a similar program at a local level, now under the Lincoln Heritage Council. The camp continues to offer high adventure related facilities for sailing, canoeing, kayaking and U.S. Coast Guard approved sailing training.

Awards
The Triple Crown of National High Adventure award was created in 1995 and later the Grand Slam of National High Adventure award was created in 2014 by the Charles L. Sommers Alumni Association, Inc. to both promote the Boy Scouts of America’s National High Adventure programs and help identify those Scouts with a thirst for high adventure who may be interested in serving on the staff of Northern Tier High Adventure Bases and other National High Adventure Bases. The Triple Crown of National High Adventure award honors those who have participated in a high adventure program at three of the Boy Scouts of America's four National High Adventure Bases. The Grand Slam of National High Adventure award honors those who have participated a high adventure program at all four of the Boy Scouts of America's National High Adventure Bases.

Alumni Associations

Charles L. Sommers Alumni Association, Inc.
The Charles L. Sommers Alumni Association, Inc. (SAA) is a non-profit Minnesota charity with the purpose to provide a continuing interest in and support for the mission and programs of the Northern Tier National High Adventure program, the Boy Scouts of America’s oldest National High Adventure program.

Objectives include preserving and promoting wilderness camping, high adventure, and training opportunities; spreading the spirit of "The Far Northland" throughout Scouting, and offering the time, talent, and treasure of its membership to the Northern Tier National High Adventure program. Through its members, it has been instrumental as the first alumni association to launch capital campaigns in conjunction with the Boy Scouts of America to enhance high adventure base facilities and establish an endowed seasonal staff scholarship program.

Active membership is open to all persons who have served on the seasonal or permanent staff of any Northern Tier National High Adventure program, including the Charles L. Sommers National High Adventure Base, Donald Rogert Canoe Base (Atikokan, Ontario), Northern Expeditions (Bissett, Manitoba), Northern Wisconsin National Canoe Base, and Maine National High Adventure Base.

Affiliate membership is open to all former adult crew advisors from any Northern Tier National High Adventure program and any adult who wishes to maintain a significant interest in the mission and success of the Northern Tier National High Adventure program.

Philmont Staff Association, Inc.
The Philmont Staff Association, Inc. (PSA) is a non-profit New Mexico charity with the purpose to provide a continued support of Philmont Scout Ranch.

Membership is open to all those who have served on staff at Philmont. In addition to traditional staff positions, membership is also open to those who have served on staff of Autumn Adventure, Kanik, Philmont Training Center, National Junior Leader Instructor Camp (NJLIC), and National Advanced Youth Leadership Experience (NAYLE). The PSA is the only National High Adventure base alumni association that does not offer membership to those who have not served on staff.

Sea Base Alumni and Friends Association, Inc.
The Sea Base Alumni and Friends Association, Inc. (SBAFA) is a non-profit Florida charity with the purpose to provide continued support of Florida National High Adventure Sea Base. Objectives include supporting the staff, programs and interest of Florida Sea Base.

Membership is open to all those with an affiliation to Florida Sea Base, including current staff, former staff, members of the community, volunteers, and past participants.

References

External links
 BSA high adventure bases official website
 James W. Loewen book, Up a Creek, With a Paddle; the first third treats Region 7 Canoe Base

National camps of the Boy Scouts of America